An Socach is a mountain at the head of Glen Cannich, in the Highlands of Scotland. It is situated between Loch Mullardoch in Glen Cannich, and Loch Monar in Glen Strathfarrar.

References

Munros
Mountains and hills of Highland (council area)
Marilyns of Scotland
One-thousanders of Scotland